The Franco-American alliance was the 1778 alliance between the Kingdom of France and the United States during the American Revolutionary War. Formalized in the 1778 Treaty of Alliance, it was a military pact in which the French provided many supplies for the Americans.  The Netherlands and Spain later joined as allies of France; Britain had no European allies.  The French alliance was possible once the Americans captured a British invasion army at Saratoga in October 1777, demonstrating the viability of the American cause.  The alliance became controversial after 1793 when Britain and Revolutionary France again went to war and the U.S. declared itself neutral. Relations between France and the United States worsened as the latter became closer to Britain in the Jay Treaty of 1795, leading to an undeclared Quasi War. The alliance was defunct by 1794 and formally ended in 1800.

Background
France had been left deeply alarmed by the British success in the Seven Years' War and believed that the British had been given naval superiority. From 1763, France and its ally, Spain, began to rebuild their navies, prepare for a future war, and construct an alliance to overwhelm and invade Britain. As the troubles in its American colonies intensified during the 1760s and eventually led to open rebellion against the British in 1775, France began to anticipate the American rebels joining such an alliance.

In September 1775, the Continental Congress described foreign assistance as "undoubtedly attainable" and began to seek supplies and assistance from European powers hostile to Britain. The French leadership sought the "humiliation of England" and began giving covert aid to the rebels. The American Declaration of Independence was advocated by some as necessary to secure European support against Britain. Silas Deane, an American envoy in Paris, proposed a major anti-British alliance and French invasions of Hanover and Portugal, both of which were British allies.

The alliance was promoted in the United States by Thomas Jefferson, a Francophile. Based on the Model Treaty of 1776, Jefferson encouraged the role of France as an economic and military partner to the United States to weaken British influence.

In 1776, Latouche Tréville transferred ammunition from France to the United States. Numerous French supplies as well as guns of the de Valliere type were used in the American War of Independence, especially the smaller 4-pounder field guns. The guns were shipped from France, and the field carriages provided for in the United States. The guns played an important role in such battles as the Battle of Saratoga, and the Siege of Yorktown. George Washington wrote about the supplies and guns in a letter to General Heath on 2 May 1777:

On 13 June 1777, Gilbert du Motier, Marquis de Lafayette, reached America and joined Washington in the Continental Army as a major general. He participated to the Battle of Brandywine, where he was wounded, and he later served at the Battle of Rhode Island. Lafayette would later return to France during the war to advocate more support for the American cause.

Treaty of Alliance

The alliance was formally negotiated by Benjamin Franklin, but it progressed slowly until after news of the American victory at the Battle of Saratoga arrived in France. On February 6, 1778 two treaties were signed. The first, the Franco-American Treaty of Amity and Commerce, recognized the independence of the United States and established commercial relations between them; the second treaty, the 1778 Treaty of Alliance was a military alliance and signed immediately thereafter as insurance in case fighting with Britain erupted as a result of signing the commercial treaty. The alliance the gave open support from the French Army, Navy, and Treasury and stated that the United States had to guarantee "from the present time and forever, against all other powers (...) the present Possessions of the Crown of France in America," in exchange for a promise not to increase French possessions anywhere in America.

Operations

The combined strength of the Americans and the French virtually guaranteed victory against Great Britain. France successfully supported the American War of Independence, managing to expel the British and obtain recognition of American independence through the intervention of Rochambeau, Lafayette, de Grasse, and Suffren.

European front
Naval conflict started in European waters with the First Battle of Ushant in July 1778, and continued with the attempted invasion of Britain by the Armada of 1779.

1st American Campaign
In the summer of 1778, French Admiral d'Estaing arrived with a fleet and infantry reinforcements for the war with a fleet of twelve ships of the line and fourteen frigates. After declining to attack Richard Howe's inferior British force outside New York, the French fleet sailed to Rhode Island where they were to take part in an attack on Newport.

On 6 July 1779, he successfully fought the Battle of Grenada against Admiral Byron, but failed at the September 1779 Siege of Savannah before returning to France. Actions continued in April 1780 with Guichen against Admiral Rodney in the Battle of Martinique.

2nd American Campaign

In 1780, Rochambeau arrived with a fleet and 6,000 French troops to join the Continental army, under George Washington, in the "Expédition Particulière", landing in Newport, Rhode Island, on 10 July. In the Ohio valley, French Americans would also combine with Indian troops, as in the Battle of Kekionga in 1780 under Augustin de La Balme.

The French Navy played a decisive role in supporting the American side, as American forces could hardly resist the powerful British Navy. The French under de Grasse defeated a British fleet at the Battle of the Chesapeake in 1781, thus ensuring that the Franco-American ground forces would win the ongoing Siege of Yorktown, the last major land battle of the Revolutionary War. The British surrendered to American and French forces at Yorktown in 1781.

France continued to fight against the British in the 1782 Antilles War.

Campaign in India

France further supported the war effort against Great Britain by attacking British possessions in India. In 1782, Louis XVI sealed an alliance with the Peshwa Madhu Rao Narayan. Suffren became the ally of Hyder Ali in the Second Anglo-Mysore War against British rule in India, in 1782–1783, fighting the British fleet on the coasts of India and Ceylon.

Between February 1782 until June 1783, Suffren fought the English admiral Sir Edward Hughes, and collaborated with the rulers of Mysore. Suffren fought in the Battle of Sadras on February 17, 1782, the Battle of Providien on April 12 near Trincomalee, the Battle of Negapatam (1782) on July 6 off Cuddalore, after which Suffren seized upon the anchorage of Trincomalee compelling the small British garrison to surrender. An army of 3,000 French soldiers collaborated with Hyder Ali to capture Cuddalore. Finally the Battle of Trincomalee took place near that port on September 3. These battles can be seen as the last battles of the Franco-British conflict that encompassed the American War of Independence, and would cease in 1783 with the signature of the 1783 peace treaty.

Aftermath

Finally, the Treaty of Paris was signed on 3 September 1783, establishing British recognition of American independence and ending the hostilities.

The 1778 Treaty of Alliance, promising the defense of French territory in the American continent, failed to be observed by the United States as soon as 1793, when France entered in conflict with Great Britain in the Caribbean. All the U.S. could do was to maintain neutrality, but this neutrality was so negative as to forbid the French the right to equip and arm privateers in American ports, or the right to dispose of French prizes in the United States. These reluctances in effect marked the end of the alliance.

As the United States entered into a treaty of commerce with Great Britain in 1794, France started to raid American shipping, seizing 316 ships in 1796. In 1796, the disillusioned Minister Pierre Adet explained: "Jefferson (...) is American, and as such, he cannot sincerely be our friend. An American is the born enemy of all the European peoples", and in 1798, the XYZ Affair considerably worsened Franco-American relations.

The events led to the Quasi-War (1798–1800) between France and the United States, with actual naval encounters taking place between the two powers, with the encounter between USS Constellation and French ship L'Insurgente on 9 February 1799 off Nevis Island, and USS Constellation and La Vengeance in February 1800 off Guadeloupe. An agreement followed, in which the United States agreed to pay 20 million dollars in compensation, and France agreed to give up its claims to the 1778 Treaty.

Britain would also attempt to interfere with American trade and shipping, starting with the Orders in Council in 1807, which forbade trade with France by Britain, her allies, and any neutral nation, which meant the United States. The US protested that this act was illegal under international law, and this act was a contributory factor to the enmity between the US and Britain which caused the War of 1812.

Historical perspectives

Many historians originally agreed that the American victory over the British at Saratoga, New York, was the deciding factor in the formation of the alliance. However, in recent decades, historians have begun to rethink the victory's contribution to the formation of the alliance and to see the alliance as an inevitable result of individual governmental interests.

In the wake of the Seven Years' War, the American Revolution began across the Atlantic. Britain's victory against France and its allies in the war made the French feel vulnerable to British power. The French saw the American Revolution as a way to strengthen itself and cripple the British Empire. At the beginning, the French helped fuel the American war effort but did not come out as an official ally on the side of the Americans. American envoys to France, namely Silas Deane, feared so much that the French would never join the war that they thought of telling the French that unless they sufficiently supported the war effort, the Americans would begin peace talks with Britain.

Charles Gravier, comte de Vergennes, appeared ready to offer official treaty negotiations if the Americans promised to remain independent. Because they had consistently maintained that independence was non-negotiable, Vergennes's demand proved that their strategy to threaten reunion with Britain influenced France's thinking. It also demonstrates that the victory at Saratoga played little role in the calculations of American, French, and British diplomats. Indeed, two more months of diplomacy would pass before the signing of the Franco-American treaty.

Bibliography
 Bemis, Samuel Flagg. The Diplomacy of the American Revolution (1935) online edition
 Brands, H. W. The First American: The Life and Times of Benjamin Franklin (2002) excerpt and text search
 Brecher, Frank W.  Securing American Independence: John Jay and the French Alliance. Praeger Publishers, 2003. pp. xiv, 327 online
 Chartrand, René, and Back, Francis. The French Army in the American War of Independence Osprey; 1991.
 Corwin, Edward S. French Policy and the American Alliance of 1778  Archon Books; 1962.
 Dull, Jonathan R. (1975) The French Navy and American Independence: A Study of Arms and Diplomacy, 1774–1787. Princeton: Princeton University Press. .
 Dull, Jonathan R. (1985) A Diplomatic History of the American Revolution. New Haven: Yale University Press. .
 Kaplan, Lawrence S. "The Diplomacy of the American Revolution: the Perspective from France." Reviews in American History 1976 4(3): 385–390.  Fulltext in Jstor; review of Dull (1975)
 Ferling, John.  "John Adams: Diplomat," William and Mary Quarterly 51 (1994): 227–52.
 Hutson, James H. John Adams and the Diplomacy of the American Revolution (1980).
 Hoffman, Ronald,  and Peter J. Albert, eds. Diplomacy and Revolution: The Franco-American Alliance of 1778 (1981)
 Hoffman, Ronald,  and Peter J. Albert, eds.  Peace and the Peacemakers:The Treaty of Paris of 1783 (1986).
 Hudson, Ruth Strong. The Minister from France: Conrad-Alexandre Gérard, 1729–1790. Lutz, 1994. 279 pp.
 Kaplan, Lawrence S., ed. The American Revolution and "A Candid World (1977)
 
 Ketchum, Richard M. Saratoga: Turning Point of America's Revolutionary War. New York: Holt Paperbacks, 1999.
 Kennett, Lee.  The French Forces in America, 1780–1783. Greenwood, 1977. 188 pp.
 Lint, Gregg L.   "John Adams on the Drafting of the Treaty Plan of 1776," Diplomatic History 2 (1978): 313–20.
 Perkins, James Breck. France in the American Revolution (1911) full text online
 Pritchard, James. "French Strategy and the American Revolution: a Reappraisal."  Naval War College Review 1994 47(4): 83–108. 
 Schiff, Stacy. A Great Improvisation: Franklin, France, and the Birth of America (2005)
 Simms, Brendan. Three Victories and a Defeat: The Rise and Fall of the First British Empire. Penguin Books, 2008.
 Stinchcombe, William E. The American Revolution and the French Alliance (1969)
 Tudda, Chris. "A Messiah that Will Never Come." Diplomatic History, issue 5 (November, 2008): pp. 779–810.
 Unger, Harlow Giles. Lafayette (2002) online

See also

 Foreign alliances of France
 France in the American Revolutionary War
 France in the Seven Years War
 Franco-Indian alliance
 French weapons in the American Civil War
 List of French units in the American Revolutionary War

French commanders in the alliance

References

Further reading
 Stockley, Andrew (2001). Britain and France at the Birth of America: The European Powers and the Peace Negotiations of 1782–1783. Exeter: University of Exeter Press. .

1778 establishments in France
1778 establishments in the United States
1778 in international relations
18th-century military alliances
American
Military alliances involving the United States
American Revolutionary War
Anglo-French War (1778–1783)
France–United States military relations